Berényi or Berény may refer to:

People with the surname 
Dénes Berényi (1928–2012), Hungarian nuclear physicist
Ferenc Berényi (1927–2004), Hungarian painter
László Berényi (born 1961), Hungarian politician
Miki Berenyi (born 1967), British musician, singer and guitarist for Lush
József Berényi (born 1967), ethnic Hungarian politician in Slovakia
Róbert Berény (1887 – 1953), Hungarian painter
Charlotte Wiehe-Berény (1865 – 1947), Danish actor, dancer, and singer

Other uses 
Berény, a given name
5694 Berényi, a minor planet named after Dénes Berényi
Beriu, a commune in Hunedoara County, Transylvania, Romania

Hungarian-language surnames